Dylan Greenberg is an American film director and musician most notable for directing the 2015 film Dark Prism. She has directed content for Adult Swim as well as the feature films ReAgitator: Revenge of the Parody, Glamarus, Wakers, and Amityville: Vanishing Point. 
Greenberg has directed music videos for Michael C. Hall's band Princess Goes to the Butterfly Museum, James Chance and the Contortions Finnish funk star  Mac Gollehon Blondie keyboardist Matt Katz-Bohen's solo project with his wife Laurel, Pastel Confession and Suicide Squeeze Records band Death Valley Girls.
Greenberg directed a horror parody of Re-Animator entitled Re-Agitator: Revenge of the Parody starring Aurelio Voltaire Hernandez and Alan Merrill.

Early life
Greenberg was born in Manhattan, New York to parents Keith Elliot Greenberg and Jennifer Berton and was raised in Brooklyn. She directed her first feature film at 17, and has since directed and co-directed six released feature films.

Career
Dylan is currently in production on her seventh feature film Spirit Riser which stars Cherie Currie and Lynn Lowry. Dylan is also known for her work with Troma Entertainment and Lloyd Kaufman. Greenberg is currently co-starring in Kaufman's upcoming film "Shakespeare's Shitstorm" with Debbie Rochon. Greenberg directed a music video for Finnish funk star Sam Huber, which premiered on European television network Yle.

Dark Prism
Greenberg directed the microbudget feature film Dark Prism (2015) while she was still in high school, which featured appearances by Lloyd Kaufman, Matt Katz-Bohen, and Mac DeMarco. At age 18 Greenberg was able to garner press from Rolling Stone, Vice, Pitchfork and more, arguably making it the most internationally discussed feature film to have a total budget under 1,000 dollars of 2015. Dark Prism showed internationally at Festivalito De La Palma festival in the Canary Islands to critical acclaim and is now available to watch on Amazon Prime.

Amityville: Vanishing Point
Greenberg directed a feature film titled Amityville: Vanishing Point which served as a David Lynch inspired dark parody of horror films.

ReAgitator: Revenge of the Parody
Hoping to take the parody element further, Greenberg directed the feature film ReAgitator: Revenge of the Parody as a queer and woman centered Dada inspired homage to horror films such as Re-Animator and The Pit and the Pendulum.

The Bathtub
In 2020, Greenberg released a short film starring Bob Bert of Sonic Youth called The Bathtub. The actors were shot entirely on green screen and then inserted into carefully placed miniatures, to create the illusion of the action taking place inside of dollhouses. The film premiered in Yahoo Entertainment.

The Puppeteer’s Assistant
In 2021, Greenberg directed a short film for the Adult Swim compilation “Smalls Volume 5” entitled “The Puppeteer’s Assistant”. The film utilized a combination of live action and computer animation.

References

External links

Living people
1997 births
Film producers from New York (state)
American film actresses
American women film directors
American women screenwriters
American television writers
Film directors from Texas
21st-century American women writers
Film directors from New York City
Screenwriters from New York (state)
American women film producers
21st-century American women musicians
American women television writers
21st-century American screenwriters